Michael Kaplan is an American costume designer for film. Born in Philadelphia, Pennsylvania, Kaplan has been working in the Hollywood film industry since the 1978 film Thank God It's Friday.

He won the British Academy of Film and Television Arts Award for Best Costume Design together with Charles Knode in 1983 for his costume design work on Blade Runner, the first theatrically-released film he had worked on as costume designer. He went on to become a nominee in the Costume Designers Guild Awards 1999 and the Costume Designers Guild Awards 2005 in the category of Excellence in Costume Design for Film - Contemporary for his costume designs for Fight Club and Mr. & Mrs. Smith, respectively.

Besides Fight Club, Kaplan has worked on three other films for director David Fincher: Seven, The Game, and Panic Room. He also reunited with Blade Runner director Ridley Scott on Matchstick Men. Kaplan's other credits include two films for Michael Bay, Armageddon and Pearl Harbor. He also worked on Flashdance, Clue, Perfect, National Lampoon's Christmas Vacation, Malice, The Long Kiss Goodnight, Gigli, Miami Vice, I Am Legend starring Will Smith, J. J. Abrams' Star Trek and Star Trek Into Darkness, The Sorcerer's Apprentice for director Jon Turteltaub, and Burlesque, starring Christina Aguilera and Cher. His contribution to Burlesque resulted in a Costume Designers Guild Award nomination for "Excellence In Contemporary Film".

Kaplan reunited with Abrams for the first film in the Star Wars sequel trilogy, Star Wars: The Force Awakens, and returned to the franchise as costume designer for both Star Wars: The Last Jedi and Star Wars: The Rise of Skywalker.

Filmography

References

External links 
 

American costume designers
Best Costume Design BAFTA Award winners
Living people
Year of birth missing (living people)
Artists from Philadelphia